Roger Federer was the defending champion, but withdrew from the tournament after undergoing surgery on his right knee. 

Novak Djokovic won the title, defeating Stefanos Tsitsipas in the final, 6–3, 6–4. Djokovic saved three match points in his semifinal match agasint Gaël Monfils.

Seeds

Draw

Finals

Top half

Bottom half

Qualifying

Seeds

Qualifiers

Qualifying draw

First qualifier

Second qualifier

Third qualifier

Fourth qualifier

References

External links
 Main draw
 Qualifying draw

Men's Singles